The Wholesale and Retail functional constituency is a functional constituency in the elections for the Legislative Council of Hong Kong first created in 1995 as one of the nine new functional constituencies under the electoral reform carried out by the then Governor Chris Patten, in which the electorate consisted of total 101,988 eligible voters worked related to the wholesale and retail industry.

The constituency was abolished with the colonial Legislative Council dissolved after the transfer of the sovereignty in 1997. The constituency was recreated for the 1998 Legislative Council election unless its electorate base has been narrowed and from individual voting to bodies that are members of 82 wholesale and retail associations. After the major electoral overhaul in 2021, the registered voters were scrapped from 6,104 to 2,015 corporate members of the 99 wholesale and retail associations.

Since its creation, it has been controlled by the Liberal Party and currently represented by Shiu Ka-fai.

Return members

Electoral results

2020s

2010s

2000s

1990s

References

Constituencies of Hong Kong
Constituencies of Hong Kong Legislative Council
Functional constituencies (Hong Kong)
1995 establishments in Hong Kong
Constituencies established in 1995
Retailing in Hong Kong
Wholesaling